The Örebro regional council is the regional council of Örebro County in Sweden.

Council has 71 members. After 2018 elections the largest parties are Social Democratic Party,  Moderate Party and Sweden Democrats, in that order.

External links 
 

County Councils of Sweden
Örebro County